The 1966–67 1re série season was the 46th season of the 1re série, the top level of ice hockey in France. Chamonix Hockey Club won their 23rd league title.

Final ranking
 1st place: Chamonix Hockey Club
 2nd place: Ours de Villard-de-Lans
 3rd place: Athletic Club de Boulogne-Billancourt
 4th place: Sporting Hockey Club Saint Gervais
 5th place: US Métro
 6th place: Français Volants
 7th place: Gap Hockey Club
 8th place: CPM Croix
 9th place: ?
 10th place: Diables Rouges de Briançon
 11th place: ?
 12th place: ?
 13th place: CSG Paris
 14th place: Les Houches
 15th place: ?
 16th place: Pralognan-la-Vanoise
 17th place: ASPP Paris
 18th place: Grenoble UNI
 19th place: Pingouins de Morzine

External links
List of French champions on hockeyarchives.info

France
1966–67 in French ice hockey
Ligue Magnus seasons